Guilford Mitchell Wiley was a member of the Wisconsin State Assembly.

Biography
Wiley was born on July 10, 1880, in Whiteland, Indiana. He attended Franklin College, Indiana University and DePauw University. From 1921 to 1926, he was principal of La Crosse Central High School. Additionally, Wiley was a math and economics teacher and was a baseball and basketball coach. A resident of Galesville, Wisconsin, he died on May 2, 1955.

Political career
Wiley was a member of the Assembly during the 1947 and 1949 sessions. Previously, he had been a superintendent of schools. In 1952, he was a candidate for Lieutenant Governor of Wisconsin. He was a Republican.

References

External links

People from Johnson County, Indiana
Politicians from La Crosse, Wisconsin
People from Galesville, Wisconsin
Republican Party members of the Wisconsin State Assembly
American Presbyterians
20th-century Presbyterians
Franklin College (Indiana) alumni
Indiana University alumni
DePauw University alumni
1880 births
1955 deaths
20th-century American politicians